Tropidacris cristata, the giant red-winged grasshopper, is a species of lubber grasshopper in the family Romaleidae.

Subspecies
These three subspecies belong to the species Tropidacris cristata:
 Tropidacris cristata cristata (Linnaeus, 1758)
 Tropidacris cristata dux (Drury, 1770)
 Tropidacris cristata grandis (Thunberg, 1824)

References

External links

 

Romaleidae
Insects described in 1758